One Small Step may refer to:

 "One small step," a phrase spoken by Neil Armstrong as he became the first person to set foot on the Moon.
 One Small Step (album), an album by John Butler
 One Small Step..., an album by Guy Manning
 One Small Step (short story), a 1990 novella by Reginald Hill
 One Small Step: The Story of the Space Chimps, a 2008 documentary film
 "One Small Step" (Star Trek: Voyager), an episode of the TV series
 "One Small Step", a song by Ayreon from Universal Migrator Part 1: The Dream Sequencer
 "One Small Step...," an episode of the TV program EUReKA
 One Small Step (film), a 2018 Chinese-American animated short film